Paranotoreas ferox  is a species of moth in the family Geometridae. This species is endemic to New Zealand. This species was first described by Arthur Gardiner Butler in 1877 and named Fidonia ferox. In 1986 Robin C. Craw placed this species within the genus Paranotoreas.

References 

Larentiinae
Moths of New Zealand
Endemic fauna of New Zealand
Moths described in 1877
Taxa named by Arthur Gardiner Butler
Endemic moths of New Zealand